Bongpyeong-myeon is a myeon (township) in the county of Pyeongchang in the province of Gangwon-do, South Korea. The myeon is located in northwestern part of the county. The total area of Bongpyeong-myeon is 217.41 square kilometers, and, as of 2008, the population was 5,545 people.

The town is the setting of the When Buckwheat Flowers Bloom (1936) short story by Lee Hyo-seok, and its buckwheat fields are considered to be a major tourist attraction.

Attractions 
 Bogwang Phoenix Park: venue of 2018 Winter Olympics
 Mount Taegisan
 Phoenix Park: It offers an extensive selection, as well as ski and snowboard instruction for beginner skiers

References 

Pyeongchang County
Towns and townships in Gangwon Province, South Korea